Sanjabad-e Shomali Rural District is in the Central District of Kowsar County, Ardabil province, Iran. At the census of 2006, its population was 5,182 in 1,039 households; there were 4,765 inhabitants in 1,177 households at the following census of 2011; and in the most recent census of 2016, the population of the rural district was 3,517 in 960 households. The largest of its 27 villages was Karandaq, with 502 people.

References 

Kowsar County

Rural Districts of Ardabil Province

Populated places in Ardabil Province

Populated places in Kowsar County